PGA Tour is a series of golf video games developed and published by Electronic Arts - and later their EA Sports sub-label - since 1990. The series primarily features courses featured on the U.S. PGA Tour, and other notable courses (such as those that have hosted majors).

In 1998, EA began publishing their golf games with the endorsement of Tiger Woods. Following the Tiger Woods 99 PGA Tour Golf release, subsequent titles were named Tiger Woods PGA Tour and released yearly.

Although EA Sports developed most games in the series internally, some SKUs have come from outside developers including the first edition, Tiger Woods 99 PGA Tour Golf, which Adrenalin Entertainment developed in conjunction with EA for the PlayStation and Tiger Woods PGA Tour 2001 for the PlayStation, which was developed by Stormfront Studios. IOMO also produced versions of the game for mobile phones for the 2002, 2004, and 2005 editions.

In October 2013, EA ended its relationship with Woods, being replaced with Rory McIlroy, then top golfer in the world, who became the new title athlete of the franchise, known as Rory McIlroy PGA Tour.

The series was responsible for several innovations in the genre, such as the now standard three-click swing method. In 1995 a critic stated in GamePro that "The PGA series flies high above the rest for two reasons: You can completely control a shot, and you play on the best courses around." However, unlike other games in the EA Sports label, the series was often shadowed by other competitors such as the Jack Nicklaus series, Links series, Microsoft Golf or The Golf Pro.

PGA Tour has brought in almost $771 million since its creation in 1999 to 2013.

History
Starting in 1998, Tiger Woods was the star and face of the series. The deal with Woods was worth $6.2 to 7 million a year at the height of his 15 years at EA Sports.

Both parties had agreed to incorporate the Masters into a video game for several years, but Augusta National Golf Club agreed only when the presentation and playability of the course was perfect. It took EA Tiburon's 80-person development team three years of work from 2009 to 2011 to make Augusta National available in Tiger Woods PGA Tour 12.

In January 2012 EA announced that there would be no more Tiger Woods PGA Tour for the Wii. And that it was so that the Xbox 360 and PlayStation 3 editions could enjoy new online and social features. They also said that the Xbox 360's Kinect and the PlayStation 3's PlayStation Move have both made "significant advances in motion gaming."

In February 2013, EA announced that there will be no Wii U version of Tiger Woods PGA Tour.

According to Kotaku sources, Electronic Arts reportedly planned to outsource Tiger Woods PGA Tour 15 and give the in-house team at EA Tiburon two years to make Tiger Woods PGA Tour 16 for the PlayStation 4 and Xbox One. However, when CEO John Riccitiello resigned March 2013, this plan was dropped to save costs.

In October 2013, EA's partnership with Woods and a licensing agreement with Augusta National Golf Club reached an end. According to EA, the split is a mutual decision.

The agreement with HB Studios comes after a similar long-term licensing agreement between the PGA Tour and Electronic Arts came to an end. EA had dominated electronic golf games thanks to a partnership with 15-time major tournament winner Tiger Woods. From 1999 to 2013 Tiger Woods PGA Tour was the top video golf game on the market. After EA and Woods ended their agreement in 2013, EA developed a similar game in 2015 in a partnership with Rory McIlroy. Rory McIlroy PGA Tour did not fare nearly as well as the previous EA versions featuring Woods. The game was pulled from all digital storefronts in May 2018.

In September 2018, EA relinquished its agreement with the PGA Tour in what appears to be a move away from golf games. 
In August 2018, PGA Tour licensing director Matt Iofredo said the new partnership with HB Studios is part of the sport's on-going efforts to introduce golf to a wider audience.

On March 29, 2021, EA announced that a new next-gen golf video game, currently in development on the Frostbite (game engine) under the name of EA SPORTS PGA TOUR, will take advantage of next-gen technology.
This will be through a new long-term agreement signed this year with the PGA TOUR.

EA announced on April 7, 2021, a day before the 2021 Masters, that the Masters and its home, Augusta National Golf Club in Augusta, Georgia, will be playable exclusively in EA Sports PGA Tour. It will be released under the name EA Sports PGA Tour: Road to the Masters and along with the Masters event, EA Sports PGA Tour will feature the PGA Championship, the U.S. Open and the Open Championship, making it the only video game to feature all four major men's professional golf tournaments.

EA Sports is returning to the golf market to compete with the PGA Tour 2K franchise from 2K Sports. The 2020 PGA Tour 2K21 featured 15 real-world courses, some of which had already hosted major tournaments. But 2K didn't have the rights to the names of the actual major tournaments.

This led EA to announce that they had captured the course and traditions of the Masters", having made their first-ever "aerial sweep of its kind to collect millions of data points, previously unavailable in golf games, to authentically recreate Augusta National in the game". (Presumably, this is an improvement over the old technique - when EA announced in 2011 that it was putting Augusta National in its game for the first time, it was using "state-of-the-art laser scanning technology.") It's not yet known if EA is using the same air-scanning technology for the game's other licensed courses.

On May 17, 2021 Electronic Arts announced that EA Sports PGA Tour would be relaunched in the spring of 2022, around the next Masters tournament which will take place from April 4 to 10, 2022.

On November 3, 2021, Electronic Arts announced that the launch date for EA Sports PGA Tour would be shifted and more plans for the release date would be shared in the coming months.

On March 22, 2022 Electronic Arts announced the delay of EA Sports PGA Tour by one year to spring 2023. EA did not give a reason for the delay, nor did they announce the game's platforms.

On January 19, 2023, a gameplay trailer was released alongside a release date of March 24, 2023. It will be released for PlayStation 5, Xbox Series X and Series S, and Microsoft Windows.

On March 3, 2023, EA announced that it is being delayed until the week of the Masters Tournament, with an early access release on Tuesday, April 4, and a worldwide launch on Friday, April 7. They said this will allow them to add some final touches to the game and reflect the 2023 designs of some courses.

Course scanning
During the game Tiger Woods PGA Tour 10 to scan and faithfully reproduce the golf courses, the EA team spent seven to ten days on each of the game's 16 courses and used a 3D laser scanner made by a professional photography company called Leica. It took the equipment to each hole and placed it and did a 360-degree scan of the entire course to map the terrain of each hole, from the grass cut to the location of the trees. As they scanned the courses and took hundreds and hundreds of photos, they realized that no course is perfect. Even on some greens, they noticed small irregularities that they really wanted to replicate in the game. Even after we scanned them, we went back to the course and talked to the people who worked there, and they helped us with the smallest details, like changing the height of some of the trees in the game. This allowed for a two-millimeter level of detail, and the benefit is that when they transfer this data into the game, "you play the hole and the course exactly as you would in real life.

During the game Tiger Woods PGA Tour 12 EA Sports used a new state-of-the-art laser scanning technology that took 10 days at Augusta National Golf Club to laser scan every hole in the game. Every tree, every azalea and every undulation on every green was recreated in minute detail. And it took the equivalent of 10 people working day and night for an entire year just for Augusta National. Players got the most authentic digital representation of the tournament and Par 3 courses.

For the game EA Sports PGA Tour they conducted custom LiDAR helicopter flights over each of the game's courses, flying scans at lower altitudes and slower speeds to achieve a greater density of data points and a higher level of realism than scans from public sources. And they meticulously mapped the courses, using advanced technologies such as photogrammetry, drone technology and GPS. With this the terrain map also created accurate renderings of pavilions, vegetation, bridges, tee markers, rock formations, water and other course features. The "EA" team visited these courses to get a good understanding of how they behave in real life. From walking the holes to interviewing the course directors, the unique conditions of each golf course were mapped and recorded during these visits. They also recorded the different grass cuts and how the ball performs on them, to get a complete picture of these courses and how they perform today and in the future. With these technologies, they have achieved extreme accuracy, down to the blade of grass, for many of the game's courses. The scan of each course was transferred to EA SPORTS PGA TOUR to be developed and adjusted for the most accurate representation possible.

Games

PGA Tour Golf (1990)

Information needed

PGA Tour Golf II (1992)

Information needed

PGA Tour Golf III (1994)

Information needed

PGA Tour 96 (1995)

Information needed

PGA Tour 97 (1996)

Information needed

PGA Tour 98 (1997)

Information needed

Timeline of console and release year in the title of the game

* The year in the title of the game, not the year of release.

Tiger Woods 99 PGA Tour Golf (1998)

Information needed

Tiger Woods PGA Tour 2000 (1999)

Information needed

Tiger Woods PGA Tour 2001 (2000)

Information needed

Tiger Woods PGA Tour 2002 (2001)

Information needed

Tiger Woods PGA Tour 2003 (2002)

Information needed

Tiger Woods PGA Tour 2004 (2003)

Information needed

Tiger Woods PGA Tour 2005 (2004)

Information needed

Tiger Woods PGA Tour 06 (2005)

Information needed

Tiger Woods PGA Tour 07 (2006)

Information needed

Tiger Woods PGA Tour 08 (2007)

Information needed

Tiger Woods PGA Tour 09 (2008)

Information needed

Tiger Woods PGA Tour 10 (2009)

Information needed

Tiger Woods PGA Tour 11 (2010)

Information needed

Tiger Woods PGA Tour 12 (2011)

Information needed

Tiger Woods PGA Tour 13 (2012)

Information needed

Tiger Woods PGA Tour 14 (2013)

Information needed

Rory McIlroy PGA Tour (2015)

Information needed

EA Sports PGA Tour (2023)

Information needed

Other titles

PGA European Tour (1994)
Developed and published by Electronic Arts for the Amiga, Sega Genesis, and Amiga CD32 in 1994, for the Game Boy in 1995, and for the SNES and MS-DOS in 1996. The SNES version supports the TeeV Golf club peripheral.
 	
GamePro gave the Game Boy version a rave review, saying that it "delivers almost everything that made its 16-bit relative the best." They applauded the selection of courses, effective controls, strong realism, and the graphics, going so far as to state that when played on the Super Game Boy the game looks "almost as good as the Genesis version."

PGA Tour Pro (1997)
Developed by EA Sports and published by Electronic Arts for Windows PC in 1997.
	
The game received a score of 5.8 ("mediocre") from GameSpot.

Tiger Woods PGA Tour a.k.a. Tiger Woods PGA Tour Mobile (2009)
Developed by Exient Entertainment and published by Electronic Arts under the EA Sports branding on April 23, 2009 for iOS. The game features commentary by Sam Torrance and Kelly Tilghman. The game offers five golfers: Tiger Woods, Vijay Singh, Retief Goosen, Annika Sörenstam, and Natalie Gulbis. For courses, it has Pebble Beach Golf Links, Old Course at St Andrews, TPC Sawgrass, The K Club, Doral Golf Resort & Spa, Fancourt Links, and TPC Boston.

Tiger Woods PGA Tour Online (2010)
Tiger Woods PGA Tour Online was an online streaming version of the Tiger Woods franchise.

Players took part in single player modes or in tournaments. Tournaments were split into weekly and daily competitions, sometimes based on events then happening in the PGA Tour. For example, during the  US Open, the courses that have had the US Open had a discount on points.

Players chose between monthly and yearly subscriptions with unlimited access, or chose to pay for individual rounds through microtransactions.  Players who didn't subscribe were still allowed to compete, although they were usually allowed to play only one or two rounds each day.

On September 6, 2011, it became integrated with the Tiger Woods PGA Tour 12 PC version. EA Sports retired Tiger Woods PGA Tour Online on July 6, 2013.

Notes

References

External links
Official site

Electronic Arts franchises
EA Sports games
Golf video games
Tiger Woods
Video game franchises
Video game franchises introduced in 1990